Butterwood Methodist Church and Butterwood Cemetery is a historic Methodist church and cemetery located near Darvills, Dinwiddie County, Virginia. It was built in 1866–1867, and is a one-story, frame building in the Carpenter Gothic style. It measures approximately 34 feet wide and 45 feet long, and features board and batten siding and concave gingerbread trim.  Surrounding the church are approximately nine additional acres to which about 1,000 graves were moved from cemeteries that had to be abandoned when the 48,000-acre Camp Pickett Military Reservation was created at the beginning of World War II.

It was listed on the National Register of Historic Places in 2003.

References

External links
 

Churches on the National Register of Historic Places in Virginia
Cemeteries on the National Register of Historic Places in Virginia
National Register of Historic Places in Dinwiddie County, Virginia
Churches completed in 1867
Methodist churches in Virginia
Carpenter Gothic church buildings in Virginia
Buildings and structures in Dinwiddie County, Virginia